43 kDa receptor-associated protein of the synapse (rapsyn) is a protein that in humans is encoded by the RAPSN gene.

Function 

This protein belongs to a family of proteins that are receptor associated proteins of the synapse. It contains a conserved cAMP-dependent protein kinase phosphorylation site. It is believed to play some role in anchoring or stabilizing the nicotinic acetylcholine receptor at synaptic sites. It may link the receptor to the underlying postsynaptic cytoskeleton, possibly by direct association with actin or spectrin. Two splice variants have been identified for this gene.

Role in health and disease
In the neuromuscular junction there is a vital pathway that maintains synaptic structure and results in the aggregation and localization of the acetylcholine receptor (AChR) on the postsynaptic folds. This pathway consists of agrin, muscle-specific tyrosine kinase (MuSK protein), AChRs and the AChR-clustering protein rapsyn, encoded by RAPSN. Genetic mutations of the proteins in the neuromuscular junction are associated with Congenital myasthenic syndrome (CMS). Postsynaptic defects are the most frequent cause of CMS and often result in abnormalities in the acetylcholine receptor. The vast majority of mutations causing CMS are found in the AChR subunits and rapsyn genes.
 
The rapsyn protein interacts directly with the AChRs and plays a vital role in agrin-induced clustering of the AChR. Without rapsyn, functional synapses cannot be created as the folds do not form properly. Patients with CMS-related mutations of the rapsyn protein typically are either homozygous for N88K or heterozygous for N88K and a second mutation. The major effect of the mutation N88K in rapsyn is to reduce the stability of AChR clusters. The second mutation can be a determining factor in the severity of the disease.

Studies have shown that most patients with CMS that have rapsyn mutations carry the common mutation N88K on at least one allele. However, research has revealed that there is a small population of patients who do not carry the N88K mutation on either of their alleles, but instead have different mutations of the RAPSN gene on both of their alleles. Two novel missense mutations that have been found are R164C and L283P and the result is a decrease in co-clustering of AChR with raspyn. A third mutation is the intronic base alteration IVS1-15C>A and it causes abnormal splicing of RAPSN RNA. These results show that diagnostic screening for CMS mutations of the RAPSN gene cannot be based exclusively on the detection of N88K mutations

Interactions 

RAPSN has been shown to interact with KHDRBS1.

References

Further reading